The 2016–17 season is Queens Park Rangers' second consecutive season in the Championship following their relegation from the Premier League in the 2014–15 season and their 135th year in existence. Along with the Championship, the club will participate in the FA Cup and the Football League Cup.

The season covers the period from 1 July 2016 to 30 June 2017.

Players

First team squad

Kit
Supplier: Dryworld / Sponsor: Smarkets

The 2016/17 kits were revealed on 29 June 2016 and was streamed live on QPR's official Facebook Channel.

Kit information
QPR agreed a 10-year multimillion-pound eight figure deal with Dryworld to replace Nike as the official technical kit suppliers from the 2016/17 season.

The club confirmed a one-year deal with Smarkets as the new shirt sponsor for the 2016/17 season, the brand will be displayed on the home, away and third strips.

New contracts

Transfers

Transfers in

Loans in

Transfers out

Loans out

Friendlies

Pre-season friendlies

On 20 May 2016, QPR confirmed that they would be touring the Netherlands and would be based in the town of Ermelo. During the nine-day training camp which was between the 3rd and 12 July 2016, they played two friendly fixtures, one against Dutch Champions, PSV Eindhoven and the other against FC Groningen.

Competitions

Overview

† denotes players that left the club during the season.

Goals

Clean sheets

Discipline

References

Notes

Queens Park Rangers F.C. seasons
Queens Park Rangers